Allogaster is a genus of beetles in the longhorn beetle family. Its first appearance was believed to be around 125.45 million years ago. They are mainly found in sub-Saharan Africa.

These beetles tend to be medium-sized, with gray or brown wooden bucks and long antennae. The antennae tends to be longer than the body.

Species 
 Allogaster aethiopicus
 Allogaster bicolor
 Allogaster drumonti
 Allogaster geniculatus
 Allogaster inarmatus
 Allogaster niger
 Allogaster nigripennis
 Allogaster unicolor

References 

Achrysonini
Cerambycidae genera